Montezuma Valley Irrigation Company Flume No. 6, near Cortez, Colorado, was built in 1921.  It was listed on the National Register of Historic Places in 2012.

It is a creosote and wood-frame construction, built by the Montezuma Canal Co. and the Continental Pipe Manufacturing Co.

It has also been known as the McElmo Creek Flume.

It is located approximately 4 miles (6.4 km) east of Cortez on US 160.

The Montezuma Valley Irrigation Company continues to operate, in 2019.

References

		
National Register of Historic Places in Montezuma County, Colorado
Buildings and structures completed in 1921